Juho Sunila's second cabinet was the 19th government of Republic of Finland. Cabinet's time period was from March 21, 1931–December 14, 1932. It was majority government. 
 

 

Sunila, 2
1931 establishments in Finland
1932 disestablishments in Finland
Cabinets established in 1931
Cabinets disestablished in 1932